Yucca glauca (syn. Yucca angustifolia) is a species of perennial evergreen plant, adapted to xeric (dry)growth conditions. It is also known as small soapweed, soapweed yucca, Spanish bayonet,   and Great Plains yucca.

Yucca glauca forms colonies of rosettes. Leaves are long and narrow, up to 60 cm long but rarely more than 12 mm across. Inflorescence is up to 100 cm tall, sometimes branched sometimes not. Flowers are pendent (drooping, hanging downward), white to very pale green. Fruit is a dry capsule with shiny black seeds.

Distribution
Yucca glauca is native to central North America: occurring from the Canadian Prairies of Alberta and Saskatchewan in Canada; south through the Great Plains to Texas and New Mexico in the United States.

Pollinators 
The "honey ant" (Myrmecocystus mexicanus), among other species, has been observed collecting nectar from Y. glauca.

Uses
Soapweed yucca was a traditional Native American medical plant, used by the Blackfoot, Cheyenne, Lakota, and other tribes.

Among the Zuni people, the seed pods are boiled and used for food. Leaves are made into brushes and used for decorating pottery, ceremonial masks, altars and other objects. Leaves are also soaked in water to soften them and made into rope by knotting them together. Dried leaves are split, plaited and made into water-carrying head pads. Leaves are also used for making mats, cincture pads and other articles. The peeled roots are pounded, made into suds and used for washing the head, wool garments and blankets.

The young flower stalks and unripe fruits can be cooked and eaten.

Gallery

References

External links

USDA PLANTS: Profile for Yucca glauca (soapweed yucca)
University of Michigan at Dearborn: Native American Ethnobotany - Yucca glauca

glauca
Flora of the Canadian Prairies
Flora of the Great Plains (North America)
Flora of the United States
Flora of Alberta
Flora of Saskatchewan
Flora of Colorado
Flora of Iowa
Flora of Kansas
Flora of Missouri
Flora of Montana
Flora of Nebraska
Flora of New Mexico
Flora of North Dakota
Flora of Oklahoma
Flora of South Dakota
Flora of Texas
Flora of Wyoming
Taxa named by Thomas Nuttall
Cleaning products
Fiber plants
Plants used in Native American cuisine
Plants used in traditional Native American medicine
Garden plants of North America
Drought-tolerant plants